Frédéric Makowiecki (born 22 November 1980) is a French professional racing driver, currently competing as a  factory driver for Porsche Motorsport in the WeatherTech SportsCar Championship GTLM class.

Career
After competing in karting, Arras-born Makowiecki raced in the French Formula Three Championship, finishing 4th in Class B.

In 2003, Makowiecki began competing in the Porsche Carrera Cup France, finishing 3rd in points in 2004 and 2009, and 2nd in 2006 and 2007. He won the title in 2010 with 6 victories, 11 podiums, and 3 poles.

Makowiecki finished 4th in the 2009 FIA GT3 European Championship while driving for Hexis Racing AMR. He continued with the team in the 2010 FIA GT1 World Championship, drove for Marc VDS Racing Team in 2011, and rejoined Hexis for 2012.

Makowiecki joined Luxury Racing for the final year of the Intercontinental Le Mans Cup in 2011. He continued with Luxury Racing for the beginning of the 2012 FIA World Endurance Championship season, taking pole position at Le Mans in his final race with the team. He moved to Aston Martin Racing in 2013, claiming two wins for the team at the 6 Hours of Circuit of the Americas and the 6 Hours of Fuji. For the 2014 FIA World Endurance Championship season, he drives for Porsche AG Team Manthey in the GTE-Pro class.

In 2013, Makowiecki co-drove with Naoki Yamamoto for Weider Dome Racing, taking the win at the 42nd International Pokka Sapporo 1000km at Suzuka Circuit.

Makowiecki has been a Porsche Motorsport factory driver since 2014. He won the 2018 and 2019 12 Hours of Sebring, and the 2018 and 2020 Petit Le Mans, and the 2022 24 Hours of Le Mans, always with a Porsche 911.

For the 2023 season, Makowiecki joined the Hypercar in the World Endurance Championship, driving a Porsche 963 alongside Dane Cameron and Michael Christensen.

Racing record

Complete GT1 World Championship results

Complete Super GT results

‡ Half points awarded as less than 75% of race distance was completed.

Complete 24 Hours of Le Mans results

Complete FIA World Endurance Championship results

* Season still in progress.

References

External links
 
 

Living people
1980 births
Sportspeople from Arras
French racing drivers
French Formula Three Championship drivers
FIA GT Championship drivers
European Le Mans Series drivers
American Le Mans Series drivers
FIA GT1 World Championship drivers
24 Hours of Le Mans drivers
FIA World Endurance Championship drivers
French people of Polish descent
Blancpain Endurance Series drivers
Super GT drivers
International GT Open drivers
ADAC GT Masters drivers
24 Hours of Spa drivers
24 Hours of Daytona drivers
WeatherTech SportsCar Championship drivers
Porsche Motorsports drivers
Aston Martin Racing drivers
Nismo drivers
Rowe Racing drivers
Larbre Compétition drivers
Nürburgring 24 Hours drivers
B-Max Racing drivers
Team Penske drivers